Jacob ("Jake") Barton (born November 7, 1972, in Brooklyn, New York) is an American designer, and Founder of Local Projects, an experience design firm for museums, brands and public spaces based in New York, New York. His work focuses on storytelling and engaging audiences through emotion and technology.

Early career
In college, Jake Barton majored in performance studies (Bachelor in Science of Speech) at Northwestern University in Chicago. After graduating, he first worked doing set design work on Broadway productions. Eventually Barton started as an intern at the museum design firm, Ralph Appelbaum Associates. Working his way up, he eventually stayed at the company for seven years, and then in 2001 he left his job at Appelbaum and started graduate school at New York University, for a M.P.S. Interactive Telecommunications. He simultaneously launched Local Projects as a design firm for museums and public spaces.

Local projects

Barton was named by Crain’s as one of the Top Entrepreneurs of 2013, and his company, Local Projects, which he founded in 2002, has won awards such as the National Design Awards for Interaction Design in 2013, the AIGA Design Competition for Effective Design in 2013 and multiple MUSE Awards in 2013.

Barton’s work touches on the overlap of physical and digital, creating a range of applications for museums, education, architecture, and memorials.  For the Bill and Melinda Gates Foundation, Local Projects created a next-generation application around experiencing physics on the playground, and has worked with Frank Gehry on the Eisenhower Memorial in Washington, D.C.

As the head of Media Design for the National September 11 Memorial & Museum, Local Projects led a team of designers to create multi-media experiences that focus on using visitor’s own stories as well as the use of algorithms to curate up-to-the moment journalism around the post 9/11 world.

During his time working with the 9/11 Memorial, he also led a team, in partnership with Jer Thorp, to create an algorithm that solved the names arrangement on the panels. The names are not listed alphabetically or chronologically, but through personal relationships between the victims themselves.

Jake has spoken about visitor participation in museums and "The Museum of You", and Local Projects credited with bringing emotional storytelling and innovation to architecture. Local Projects has partnered with architects such as Frank Gehry, Diller Scofidio + Renfro and Bjarke Ingels to create new approaches in media and physical spaces.

In March 2019, Local Projects was sold to MTM, an independent network dedicated to creating value between people and brands.

Works

See also

Ralph Appelbaum Associates, US firm
Event Communications, UK firm
Gallagher & Associates, US firm
Cultural tourism
Exhibit design
Exhibition designer

References

External links
 
 TED Talk: Jake Barton: The museum of you (TEDSalon NY2013)

1972 births
Living people
People from Brooklyn
Tisch School of the Arts alumni
Northwestern University School of Communication alumni
American designers
Museum designers
Exhibition designers